Ranchot is a commune in the Jura department in the Bourgogne-Franche-Comté region in eastern France.

Geography
Ranchot is a small Jura village on the Doubs river. It is situated on the D673 (previously Route nationale 73) between Dole and Besançon, 5 km from the A36 autoroute junction 2.1.

Population

History
There is evidence of Gallo-Roman occupation (Roman roads in certain fields in the commune). In the 13th century, Ranchot was made a dependendence of Rans. The village was devastated by wars and plague in the 16th and 17th centuries.

See also
Communes of the Jura department

References

Communes of Jura (department)